The men's decathlon at the 2013 World Championships in Athletics was held at the Luzhniki Stadium on 10–11 August in Moscow, Russia.

The first day ended with two Americans leading the competition, Olympic Champion and World Record holder Ashton Eaton and, surprisingly, World Junior Champion Gunnar Nixon who set a 15 cm personal record in the Long Jump, another in the Shot Put and led the field after the High Jump.  After an average showing, particularly in the Shot Put and High Jump, Eaton regained the lead with 46.02 400 metres.  Eaton's expected rival was defending champion and Eaton's Olympic runner up, American teammate Trey Hardee, who suffered from leg cramps and was only able to take slow, half-hearted attempts at the High Jump eventually no-heighting and dropping out.

The second day opened with Eaton beating the field in the 110 hurdles, opening up over 100 points on Nixon.  Nixon's personal best was no match for Michael Schrader's personal best in the Discus as Schrader moved into second, with his German teammate Rico Freimuth and Damian Warner battling for third.  Nixon fell out of contention.  Eaton extended his lead with the third best pole vault of the day.  Schrader scored big with his personal best in his lone attempt in the Javelin, but Eaton came through on his final throw to almost keep pace.  Warner separated himself into a solid third with a personal best while Freimuth struggled with the poorest mark in the B group.  The places were decided before the 1500, and in 80 percent humidity, there were no surprises.

Records
Prior to the competition, the records were as follows:

Qualification standards

Schedule

Results

100 metres
Wind:Heat 1: -0.5 m/s, Heat 2: +0.1 m/s, Heat 3: -0.1 m/s, Heat 4: -0.5 m/s

Long jump

Shot put

High jump

400 metres

110 metres hurdles
Wind:Heat 1: -0.2 m/s, Heat 2: 0 m/s, Heat 3: -0.1 m/s, Heat 4: +0.4 m/s

Discus throw

Pole vault

Javelin throw

1500 metres

Final standings

Key:  PB = Personal best, SB = Seasonal best, WL = World leading (in a given season)

References

External links
Decathlon results at IAAF website

Decathlon
Decathlon at the World Athletics Championships